Mike Walker is the name of:

Sports
 Mike Walker (rugby union) (1930–2014), Scottish rugby union player
 Mike Walker (English footballer) (born 1945), former English footballer
 Mike Walker (Welsh footballer) (born 1945), former Welsh footballer and manager
 Mike Walker (Canadian football) (born 1958), Canadian football player
 Mike Walker (pitcher, born 1965), American baseball pitcher
 Mike Walker (pitcher, born 1966), American baseball pitcher
 Mike Walker (infielder) (born 1988), Australian baseball infielder
 Mike Walker (tennis) (born 1966), Welsh tennis player
 Mike Walker (canoeist) (born 1977), New Zealand kayaker

Music
 Mike Walker (jazz guitarist) (born 1962), jazz guitar player from Salford in England
 Mike Walker (singer), country music artist, or his self-titled debut album

Other
 Mike Walker (columnist) (1946–2018), gossip columnist for the National Enquirer
 Mike Walker (radio dramatist), dramatist for BBC radio
 Mike Walker (engineer) (1911–2013), designer and engineer employed with Remington Arms

See also
 Michael Walker (disambiguation)
 Mick Walker (disambiguation)
 Mike Sims-Walker (born 1984), NFL wide receiver